HMS Partridge was a Cormorant-class ship-sloop launched in 1809. She captured some small vessels while serving in the Mediterranean in 1813–1814. She participated in the blockade of Naples in 1815 with the result that her officers and crew received a great deal of prize money for its fall. She was broken up in 1816.

Career
Commander William Foote commissioned Partridge in September 1809. She escorted a convoy to the West Indies on 26 October 1810.

In October 1810 Commander J. M. Ayde assumed command of Partridge.

When news of the outbreak of the War of 1812 reached Britain, the Royal Navy seized all American vessels then in British ports. Partridge was among the Royal Navy vessels then lying at Spithead or Portsmouth and so entitled to share in the grant for the American ships Belleville, Janus, Aeos, Ganges and Leonidas seized there on 31 July 1812.

In 1813 and 1815 Partridge served in the Mediterranean.

On 18 July 1813, while off Manfredonia,  and Partridge attacked a small convoy and captured or destroyed all the vessels. They captured one Neapolitan gunboat armed with one 18-pounder gun, and burnt another. They also destroyed a pinnace armed with one 6-pounder gun. Lastly, they captured two trabaccolos armed with three guns each and laden with salt, and destroyed two others of the same strength and cargo.

On 24 July Partridge captured the Guisto Benfattore, Le Gere, and Desegno.

On 6 November 1813 Partridge recaptured London Packet, Holman, master.

On 13 May 1815 Partridge, was present at the surrender of Naples during the Neapolitan War. A British squadron, consisting of the 74-gun , the frigate , Partridge, and the brig-sloop  blockaded the port and destroyed all the gunboats there.

Parliament voted a grant of £150,000 to the officers and men of the squadron for the property captured at the time, with the money being paid in May 1819.

By 1816 Partridge was at Chatham.

Fate
The "Principal Officers an Commissioners of His Majesty's Navy" offered the "Partridge sloop, of 423 tons" "Lying at Chatham" for sale on 31 July 1816. She apparently did not sell and was broken up in September.

Notes, citations, and references
Notes

Citations

References
 

1809 ships
Sloops of the Royal Navy